Ella Briggs (née Baumfeld; 5 March 1880 – 20 June 1977) was an Austrian architect.

Life
Ella Baumfeld was born in Vienna on 5 March 1880, the daughter of a lawyer. As women were not allowed to study architecture under the German Empire, she studied at the painting school of the Wiener Frauenerwerbsvereines (Viennese Women's Employment Association) with Adalbert Seligmann and later at the University of Applied Arts Vienna with various teachers.

Baumfeld travelled to the United States in 1903. She was awarded a medal at the 1904 Louisiana Purchase Exposition in St. Louis, Missouri. 
In 1907, she married lawyer Walter J. Briggs in New York; they divorced in 1912. 
By 1910, she had built a reputation as an interior designer, having decorated several rooms of New York's New German Theatre located at 59th St. and Madison. Briggs also furnished and decorated the New York Press Club building with Carroll Mercer. The New York Architect magazine praised both her designs for wallpaper and stencilled friezes as well as her color schemes, writing that she had "adapted the modern principles of color harmony, simplicity, truthfulness of applied material and comfort to the American taste."

From 1916 to 1918, she was a guest student at the Technical Building School drawing classes. In 1919, she studied structural engineering at the Staatsgewerbeschule in Salzburg. She then spent two years studying with German architect Theodor Fischer at Technische Universität München.

In 1920, Briggs went to the United States, where she worked in New York and Philadelphia. 
She published in various journals. 
The designs she produced in the United States are held at the Vienna Künstlerhaus. 
In 1921, she became the first female member of the Österreichischer Ingenieur- und Architekten-Verein (Austrian Engineers and Architects Association). 
In addition, she was the first authorized architect of Austria. After returning to Vienna, she built as her only building there, the Pestalozzihof and the subsequent Ledigenheim. 
She was one of two women (with Margarete Schütte-Lihotzky) that ran for the City of Vienna council in the interwar period.

From 1930 to 1933, she lived in Berlin, where she built settlements and residential buildings. She was Jewish and fled to Vienna to avoid the Nazis. In 1936 she immigrated to England, though without a work permit. Soon after, she produced designs for a housing cooperative in Enfield. In 1947 she gained British citizenship. She opened an office in London where she worked for the rest of her life. Briggs died in London on 20 June 1977.

Works
Pestalozzi-Hof in Wien-Döbling (XIX. Bezirk), Philippovichgasse 2-4, 1925/1926
Wohnhausanlage in Berlin-Mariendorf, Rathausstraße 81-83b / Königstraße 42-43, 1930

Notes

References
Dörhöfer, Kerstin. Pionierinnen in der Architektur. Eine Baugeschichte der Moderne. Wasmuth Verlag, Tübingen 2004, 
Stingl, Katrin. Ella Briggs (-Baumfeld). Diplomarbeit Universität Wien, Wien 2008 (online version)
Eichhorn, Ulrike. Architektinnen. Ihr Beruf. Ihr Leben. Edition Eichhorn, Berlin 2013. 

1880 births
1977 deaths
Interior designers
Architects from Vienna
University of Applied Arts Vienna alumni
20th-century British architects
Austro-Hungarian emigrants to the United States
Naturalised citizens of the United Kingdom
British women architects
British interior designers
Jews who immigrated to the United Kingdom to escape Nazism
20th-century Austrian architects
American emigrants to Germany
Austrian emigrants to England